Pennsylvania Route 69 (PA 69) is a state highway in the U.S. state of Pennsylvania.  The state highway runs  from U.S. Route 62 (US 62) in Conewango Township near Warren north to the New York state line in Sugar Grove Township, where the highway continues north as County Route 69 (CR 69) in Chautauqua County.  PA 69 connects Warren, Sugar Grove, and the Chautauqua Lake area.

Route description

PA 69 begins at an intersection with US 62 (Market Street Extension) in the unincorporated community of North Warren in Conewango Township.  The state highway heads northwest as Jackson Run Road, a two-lane highway passing through a forested area with scattered residences.  PA 69 parallels Jackson Run, which empties into Conewango Creek, and crosses it a few times while passing through a narrow valley between Dutch Hill to the north and Yankee Bush Hill to the south.  The state highway briefly passes through Farmington Township before entering Sugar Grove Township.  PA 69 passes through the unincorporated community of Chandlers Valley and by a pair of ponds at the headwaters of Jackson Run before meeting the eastern terminus of PA 27 (Matthews Run Road).  PA 69 continues north to the borough of Sugar Grove.  The state highway intersects PA 957 (Main Street) and turns east to join the highway in a short concurrency to cross Stillwater Creek.  PA 957 continues east as Race Street while PA 69 turns north onto Forest Street.  Upon leaving the borough, PA 69's name changes to Big Tree Road for the short distance to the highway's northern terminus at the New York state line.  The roadway continues north as CR 69 in Chautauqua County.

Major intersections

See also

References

External links

Pennsylvania Highways: PA 69

069
Pennsylvania Route 069